Hamad Al Marri (Arabic:حمد المري) (born 12 January 1991) is an Emirati footballer.

References

External links
 Hamad Al Marri at Soccerway

1991 births
Living people
Emirati footballers
Association football midfielders
Al Ain FC players
Al Dhafra FC players
Al-Ittihad Kalba SC players
UAE Pro League players